In Quebec, a protected area is defined as "a territory, in a terrestrial or aquatic environment, geographically delimited, whose legal framework and administration aim specifically to ensure the protection and maintenance of biological diversity and of associated natural and cultural resources.

The Quebec has about twenty legal designations and more than  sites designated as protected areas.

History 
The first protected area was Parc du Mont-Royal in 1876 followed by parc de la Montagne-Tremblante in 1894.

Federal level 

Canada has five types of protections divided into two departments.
 The Environment and Climate Change Canada, through the agency Parks Canada, has two national parks (Forillon National Park and La Mauricie National Park ) and a national park reserve (Mingan Archipelago National Park Reserve ).

The agency is also responsible for a national marine conservation area: the Saguenay–St. Lawrence Marine Park, which is co-managed with the Ministry of Sustainable Development, Environment, and Fight Against Climate Change.

Also the national historic site of Grosse-Île-et-le-Mémorial-des-Irlandais is also considered a protected area.

Through the Canadian Wildlife Service, which is managed by the same department, it administers eight National Wildlife Area and twenty-seven migratory bird sanctuaries.
 Finally, the National Capital Commission (Canada), which belongs to the Minister of Transport, Infrastructure and Communities, protects Gatineau Park and Lac-Leamy park.

Provincial level

Ministry of Sustainable Development, Environment and Parks

Floristic habitat 
Under the "Endangered or Vulnerable Species Act", the ministry can also designate a plant habitat to protect a threatened or vulnerable plant. The fifty flora habitats cover .

National park 

The twenty-four national parks of Quebec, which protect  of territory, are protected areas intended to protect territories representative of the natural regions of Quebec or sites of exceptional character. Its territories are also open to the public for educational and intensive recreational purposes.

The province also has six national park reserves in Nunavik which protect . Although their legal status is lower, it offers a level of protection similar to that of national parks.

Aquatic reserve 

Aquatic reserves are areas similar to biodiversity reserves; these areas aim to protect hydrographic basins and marine environments that have little or no modification by man. The first aquatic reserve, the estuaire-de-la-Rivière-Bonaventure aquatic reserve was created in 2009 Eight other reserves are currently planned.

Biodiversity reserve 

There are 5 biodiversity reserves in Quebec which protect  of territory. This type of zone aims to maintain biodiversity in the various natural regions of Quebec. 76 new biodiversity reserves are planned in Quebec and will cover an area of

Ecological reserve 

Ecological reserves, which number 70, protect  of territory. These are territories primarily devoted to conservation, education and research. Most of these protected areas, which are small in size, protect distinctive environments, such as a swamp, forest, or watershed. Most of the ecological reserves are closed to the public, with the exception of three, namely the ecological reserves of Forêt-la-Blanche, Serpentine-de-Coleraine and Tourbières-de-Lanoraie. This is the highest level of protection offered by the province

Ministry of Natural Resources and Wildlife

Exceptional forest ecosystem 

Exceptional forest ecosystems are territories designated by the Ministry of Natural Resources and Fauna which protect various forest environments. These territories are protected, on public lands, by virtue of the "forest law". There are 3 types of exceptional forest ecosystems: “Old-growth forests” (92 sites), the rare forests (35 sites)<ref.</ref> and the refuge forests (18 sites) On private land, owners must be informed of these sites and show an interest in voluntary conservation measures so that these exceptional forest ecosystems are protected.

Wildlife habitat 
A wildlife habitat is a territory offering various species an environment necessary for the basic needs in terms of shelter, reproduction and food, of the 11 types of wildlife habitats, 7 are recognized as protected areas: the "concentration areas of aquatic birds" (735 sites)., the containment areas of the white-tailed deer (114 sites), the "habitats d’une espèce faunique menacée ou vulnérable" (habitats of threatened or vulnerable wildlife species) (2 sites), the bird colonies (133 sites)., the muskrat habitats (173 sites), the  heronries  (99 sites) and the "mud flats" (32 sites)

Wildlife refuge 
Wildlife refuges serve to protect wildlife habitats of national or regional importance or the habitat of species designated as threatened or vulnerable. There are currently 11 wildlife refuges protecting

Municipal or non-governmental level

Natural environment of voluntary conservation 
Voluntary conservation (Private Stewarship) is an approach that allows the owner to commit to the preservation of the natural heritage of his property through a non-governmental approach.

It is a community approach to conservation. Conservation organizations (land trust) are non-profit, non-governmental organizations whose mission is the conservation of nature. These organizations were set up across Quebec, Canada and around the world, by citizens who take the initiative to preserve the natural elements that are close to their hearts. Thus, conservation organizations assist owners who want to ensure that their land is protected for generations to come, they reconcile conservation and land use, they protect and enhance their properties through extensive and educational activities, they promote an integrated approach to land use planning.

On private land, this approach is the most promising for guaranteeing the preservation of biodiversity. Donations, conservation easements or acquisitions for conservation purposes ensure the conservation of sites in perpetuity and provide certain tax advantages for the landowner who undertakes to do so.

In Quebec, the Network of Protected Natural Environments brings together owners and managers who work for the conservation of natural heritage across Quebec. It plays a unique role in consolidating a network of partners and encouraging the sharing of conservation know-how as well as promoting the preservation of nature through voluntary conservation on private land.

Nature reserve in a private environment 

A nature reserve is private land recognized by the Ministry of Sustainable Development, Environment and Parks for its biological, wildlife, plant, geological or other value The level of protection of these territories can vary greatly from one reserve to another. Quebec's 33 nature reserves protect only  of the province.

Wildlife management areas 
Although it is not a protected area, the Ministère des Ressources naturelles et de la Faune also has several types of wildlife management territories, including protected areas, outfitters and the ZECs.

Outfitter

Wildlife reserve 

Wildlife reserves are public hunting and fishing grounds dedicated to the conservation, development and use of wildlife as well as, incidentally, the practice of recreational activities. They are all administered by the Société des établissements de plein air du Québec with the exception of the wildlife reserves of Duchénier, Dunière and those located on salmon rivers which are managed by local organizations.

Controlled exploitation zone (Zec) 

The 86 controlled zones (zec) are hunting and fishing territories located on public lands. They are administered by non-profit organizations.

International recognition 

Quebec has a natural world heritage site, namely Miguasha National Park. The province also has 4 biosphere reserves, ie the biosphere reserves of Charlevoix, Lake Saint-Pierre, Manicouagan-Uapishka and Mont-Saint-Hilaire. Finally, 4 Ramsar sites are included in Quebec, namely Isle-Verte Bay, Cap Tourmente, Lake Saint François and Lake Saint-Pierre.

Notes and references

External links 
 Protected areas of Quebec, December 2007
 

Protected areas of Quebec
National parks of Quebec